The Indo Global Colleges are a group of self-financed and unaided institutes located in Abhipur, Punjab, India. The colleges were established in 2003 by the Indo Global Education Foundation (IGEF) and are affiliated to Punjab Technical University (PTU), offering various courses in engineering, architecture and management at bachelor and master levels.

Campus

The campus includes four colleges, namely the Indo Global College of Engineering, Architecture, Education and Management. There is also an IBM Center of Excellence at the Engineering campus.

Academics 
The Indo Global Colleges currently include four colleges The college of engineering offers four-year Bachelor of Technology (B.Tech.), and two-year Master of Technology (M.Tech.) degrees in various engineering fields. The college of architecture offers a five-year program awarding Bachelor of Architecture (B.Arch.), the college of education offers a one-year Bachelor of Education (B.Ed.) programme, and finally, the college of management offers a two-year Master of Business Administration (MBA). All the colleges are affiliated to Punjab Technical University and the programmes are approved by the All India Council for Technical Education.

Events and functions
IGEF has organized various events and functions to promote student culture in the institute. "Lamhe" is Indo Global Colleges annual fest being organized every year regarding freshers who joined college in respected year. It has been organized every year since 2003. "Leap" is a placement drive organized in 2010.

References

External links

 Indo Global Colleges - Official Website
 polytechnic college in punjab 
 top mba colleges in punjab
 bba colleges in chandigarh
 b tech colleges in chandigarh 
 best architecture colleges in india 

Universities and colleges in Punjab, India
2003 establishments in Punjab, India
Educational institutions established in 2003
Sahibzada Ajit Singh Nagar district